General George Campbell of Inverneill, CB, KA (1803–1882) was Commandant of the Royal Artillery and served in the East India Company.

Biography
George Campbell was born in 1803, the third son of Duncan Campbell of Inverneill B.C.S. and his wife, Elizabeth Cooper.  He was a grandson of James Campbell (1706–1760) 3rd of Tuerechan (8th Chief of Tearlach, descended from Clan Campbell of Craignish) and great nephew of Major-General Sir Archibald Campbell KB, father-in-law to Colonel Thomas Tupper Carter-Campbell of Possil and grandfather to General George Tupper Campbell Carter-Campbell CB, DSO.  He had a son and two daughters with his wife Susan "Black Beauty" Campbell of Possil (daughter of Col. Alexander Campbell of Possil).

Military career
He joined the Royal Horse Artillery of the Bengal Army in 1822 (one of the three presidencies of the British Raj) and first served in the First Anglo-Burmese War of 1824–1826 including the Battle of Donabew (March–April 1825) against the forces of General Maha Bandula.

In 1840 he was appointed chief of staff to the Lieutenant-Governor of the North-Western Provinces, Lord Auckland.  Three years later he fought in the Gwalior campaign against the Marathan forces in 1843, for which he was presented with the Gwalior Star.  At the Battle of Punniar he was awarded the bronze star and the rank of brevet major for his efforts in driving the 12,000 Marathan troops from the high ground near Mangore.

Campbell was posted to serve in the First Anglo-Sikh War (The Sutlej Campaign) of 1845–46 and achieved rank of lieutenant colonel.  He fought in the battles of Moodkee, Sobraon and Ferozeshah and was subsequently awarded the Sutlej Medal.  Two years later, the Second Anglo-Sikh War out-broke and Campbell was placed in command of the artillery division "Lahore" where he was awarded the Punjab Medal.

In 1853 Campbell had been put in charge of the Artillery Divisions ""Agra", "Meerut" and Cawnpore and in 1854 was made commander of I Brigade, Royal Horse Artillery.  In 1856, he was promoted to brigadier general and stationed at Rawal Pindee.  The following year, the Indian Mutiny commenced which Campbell served through including the Siege of Cawnpore and was presented with the Indian Mutiny Medal.  In the second year of the mutiny Campbell was promoted to major-general and commanded the forces at Banares.

Amongst the East India Company, Campbell was known to be an outstanding sportsman and a highly skilled horseman whose overly adventurous nature could become trying to members of his divisional staff.  While at Banares, he killed his hundredth tiger.

Post active service
After 1863, Campbell retired from active service (though remained serving the East India Company) and was awarded the Distinguished Service Pension in 1865.  Two years later he was appointed Companion of the Order of the Bath and in 1868 was promoted to lieutenant-general.

He returned to England in 1871 and three years later was given full rank of general and made commander of the Royal Artillery.

On 25 April 1882, at the age of 78, Campbell died at his house No. 1, Byng Place, Gordon Square, London. He is buried at the mausoleum on the grounds of Inverneill House with his brother Maj-General Archibald Lorne Campbell who died a year later.

See also

East India Company

References

1803 births
1882 deaths
Scottish soldiers
19th-century Scottish landowners
George
British East India Company Army officers
Royal Artillery officers
Royal Horse Artillery officers
Bengal Artillery officers
British military personnel of the Indian Rebellion of 1857
British Army generals
British military personnel of the First Anglo-Sikh War
British people in colonial India
British military personnel of the First Anglo-Burmese War
British military personnel of the Gwalior Campaign
British military personnel of the Second Anglo-Sikh War
Companions of the Order of the Bath
19th-century Scottish businesspeople